Midnite Movies is a line of B movies released first on VHS and later on DVD by MGM Home Entertainment.  The line was begun by MGM in March 2001 following its acquisition of Orion Pictures, which bought out Filmways, the owner of American International Pictures.  AIP had a library of B movies from the 1950s and 1960s that were science fiction, horror, and exploitation films. The Midnite Movies collection was primarily derived from the AIP library (including most of Roger Corman and Vincent Price's horror films) but also included Hammer Film Productions, Amicus Productions, United Artists, Cannon Films, and Empire International Pictures films as well. The DVDs were first released as single films, but most later releases would be double features on single double-sided discs.  Sony Pictures Home Entertainment later became owners of the MGM library and continued the "Midnite Movies" line with distributor 20th Century Fox Home Entertainment. All double feature titles released on the 20th Century Fox label were two-disc packages. By 2011, no new titles were forthcoming; the previous catalog titles slowly went out of print and the Midnite Movies website was taken down.

Beginning in 2013, independent media labels such as Shout! Factory, Scream Factory, Kino Lorber Studio Classics, Twilight Time and Olive Films have licensed titles from the former Midnite Movies line for Blu-ray release.

DVD releases

Single film releases also available in Double and/or Quadruple Features
The Abominable Dr. Phibes (OOP)
The Angry Red Planet (OOP)
At the Earth's Core (OOP)
Attack of the Puppet People (OOP)
Beach Blanket Bingo (OOP)
The Beast Within (OOP)
Count Yorga, Vampire (OOP)
Die, Monster, Die! (OOP)
Dr. Phibes Rises Again (OOP)
The Dunwich Horror (OOP)
Empire of the Ants (OOP)
The Fall of the House of Usher (OOP)
Invaders from Mars (1986) (OOP)
It! The Terror from Beyond Space (OOP)
The Man from Planet X (OOP)
The Monster That Challenged the World
Morons from Outer Space (OOP)
The People That Time Forgot (OOP)
The Pit and the Pendulum (OOP)
Strange Invaders (OOP)
Theatre of Blood (also as Theater of Blood) (OOP)
The Thing with Two Heads (OOP)
Twice-Told Tales (OOP)
Village of the Giants (OOP)
War-Gods of the Deep (OOP)
The Wild Angels (OOP)

Single film releases not available in Double Features
Donovan's Brain (OOP)
Dr. Goldfoot and the Bikini Machine (OOP)
The Food of the Gods (OOP)
I Bury the Living (OOP)
The Island of Dr. Moreau (1977) (OOP)
Killer Klowns from Outer Space
The Man from Planet X (OOP)
Mars Needs Women (OOP)
Planet of the Vampires (OOP)
Reptilicus (OOP)
The Thing with Two Heads (OOP) 
Witchfinder General
X: The Man with the X-ray Eyes (OOP)

Double Feature releases
The Abominable Dr. Phibes / Dr. Phibes Rises Again (OOP)
Angel Unchained / Cycle Savages
Attack of the Puppet People / Village of the Giants
The Attic / Crawlspace (OOP)
Beach Blanket Bingo / How to Stuff a Wild Bikini (HtSaWB was also released as a single disc, but not as a Midnite Movie)
Beach Party / Bikini Beach
The Beast Within / The Bat People
A Blueprint for Murder / Man in the Attic
Chosen Survivors / The Earth Dies Screaming
The Comedy of Terrors / The Raven (1963) (OOP)
Count Yorga, Vampire / The Return of Count Yorga (OOP)
Countess Dracula / The Vampire Lovers (OOP)
Cry of the Banshee / Murders in the Rue Morgue (1971) (OOP)
Crystalstone / The Boy and the Pirates
Deranged / Motel Hell (OOP)
Devils of Darkness / Witchcraft
Die, Monster, Die! / The Dunwich Horror (OOP)
Empire of the Ants / Tentacles
The Fall of the House of Usher / The Pit and the Penduium (1961)
Fireball 500 / Thunder Alley
Fortunes of Captain Blood / Captain Pirate
Ghost of Dragstrip Hollow / The Ghost in the Invisible Bikini
Gorilla at Large / Mystery on Monster Island
The Haunted Palace / Tower of London
The House on Skull Mountain / The Mephisto Waltz
The Incredible 2-Headed Transplant / The Thing with Two Heads
Invisible Invaders / Journey to the Seventh Planet
Invasion of the Star Creatures / Invasion of the Bee Girls
The Land That Time Forgot / The People That Time Forgot (OOP)
The Masque of the Red Death / The Premature Burial
The Mini-Skirt Mob / Chrome and Hot Leather
Morons from Outer Space / Alien from L.A. (Alien from L.A. was also released as a single disc, but not as a Midnite Movie)
The Monster That Challenged the World / It! The Terror from Beyond Space
Muscle Beach Party / Ski Party
The Oblong Box / Scream and Scream Again
Panic in Year Zero! / The Last Man on Earth (TLMOE was also released as a single disc, but not as a Midnite Movie)
The Phantom from 10,000 Leagues / The Beast with a Million Eyes
Psych-Out / The Trip (OOP)
The Return of Dracula / The Vampire (OOP)
Strange Invaders / Invaders from Mars
Tales from the Crypt / The Vault of Horror (OOP)
Tales of Terror / Twice-Told Tales (ToT was also released as a single disc, but not as a Midnite Movie) (OOP)
Theatre of Blood (also as Theater of Blood) / Madhouse (OOP)
The Tomb of Ligeia / An Evening of Edgar Allan Poe
Voodoo Island / The Four Skulls of Jonathan Drake
War-Gods of the Deep / At the Earth's Core
The Wild Angels / Hell's Belles
Wild in the Streets / Gas-s-s-s (OOP)
What's the Matter with Helen? / Whoever Slew Auntie Roo? (OOP)
Yongary, Monster from the Deep / Konga (Konga was also released as a single disc, but not as a Midnite Movie) (OOP)

Quadruple Feature releases
Released April 5, 2011
The Land That Time Forgot / The People That Time Forgot / Panic in Year Zero! / The Last Man On Earth
Morons from Outer Space / Alien from L.A. / The Man from Planet X / The Angry Red Planet
The Phantom from 10,000 Leagues / The Beast with a Million Eyes / War-Gods of the Deep / At the Earth's Core
Strange Invaders / Invaders from Mars / Invisible Invaders / Journey to the Seventh Planet

Box sets
Midnite Movies: Creepy Classics (OOP)
- X: The Man with the X-ray Eyes
- The Fall of the House of Usher
- The Pit and the Pendulum (1961)
- The Dunwich Horror
Midnite Movies Volume One: Creatures & Monsters (OOP)
- Yongary, Monster From the Deep / Konga
- Chosen Survivors / The Earth Dies Screaming
- The Food of the Gods
- Gorilla at Large / Mystery on Monster Island
- The Phantom from 10,000 Leagues / The Beast with a Million Eyes
Midnite Movies Volume Two: Vampires & Witchcraft (OOP)
- The Beast Within / The Bat People
- Devils of Darkness / Witchcraft
- Witchfinder General
- The House on Skull Mountain / The Mephisto Waltz
- The Return of Dracula / The Vampire
Vincent Price: MGM Scream Legends Collection
- Tales of Terror / Twice-Told Tales
- The Abominable Dr. Phibes / Dr. Phibes Rises Again
- Theatre of Blood (also as Theater of Blood) / Madhouse
- Witchfinder General / Disc of Horrors (bonus disc)

Selected DVD releases
These 12 films were not later released as Midnite Movies DVDs:
The Amazing Transparent Man (a public domain film released on several different DVDs)
The Brain That Wouldn't Die (a public domain film released on several different DVDs)
A Bucket of Blood (released on an MGM DVD with the same cover sleeve art/text, but no Midnite Movies title)
Burn, Witch, Burn (released on DVD-R as part of the MGM Limited Edition Collection)
Frogs (released on an MGM DVD with the same cover sleeve art/text, but no Midnite Movies title)
High School Hellcats (released on DVD-R as part of the MGM Limited Edition Collection)
The Incredible Melting Man (released on DVD-R as part of the MGM Limited Edition Collection)
Jesse James Meets Frankenstein's Daughter (a public domain film released on several different DVDs)
Master of the World (released on DVD-R as part of the MGM Limited Edition Collection)
Pajama Party (released on an MGM DVD with the same cover sleeve art/text, but no Midnite Movies title)
The Phantom Planet (a public domain film released on several different DVDs)
The Quatermass Xperiment (released on DVD-R as part of the MGM Limited Edition Collection)

Blu-ray releases
There have been no Blu-rays released under the Midnite Movies label; however, MGM is/has been licensing many of the MM titles to independent labels for Blu-ray release. The U.S. releases are as follows.

Shout! Factory
Invaders from Mars (1986)
Motel Hell

Scream Factory
The Vincent Price Collection
The Fall of the House of Usher
The Pit and the Pendulum
The Haunted Palace
The Masque of the Red Death
Witchfinder General
The Abominable Dr. Phibes
The Vincent Price Collection II
The Raven (1963)
The Comedy of Terrors
The Last Man on Earth
The Tomb of Ligeia
Dr. Phibes Rises Again
The Vincent Price Collection III
Tower of London
An Evening with Edgar Allan Poe
Cry of the Banshee

Empire of the Ants/Jaws of Satan
The Food of the Gods/Frogs
Tentacles/Reptilicus
Tales from the Crypt/Vault of Horror
Murders in the Rue Morgue (1971)/The Dunwich Horror
Crawlspace
Die, Monster, Die!
Invasion of the Bee Girls
The Return of Count Yorga
The Vampire Lovers

KINO Studio Classics
At the Earth's Core
Donovan's Brain
Dr. Goldfoot and the Bikini Machine
The Incredible Two-Headed Transplant
Invisible Invaders
The Island of Dr. Moreau (1977)
Journey to the Seventh Planet
The Land That Time Forgot
Madhouse
The Monster That Challenged the World
The Oblong Box
Panic in Year Zero!
The People That Time Forgot
The Phantom from 10,000 Leagues
Planet of the Vampires
The Premature Burial
Tales of Terror
Twice-Told Tales
War-Gods of the Deep
X: The Man with the X-Ray Eyes
Yongary, Monster from the Deep

MGM
Killer Klowns from Outer Space

Olive Films
It! The Terror from Beyond Space
Muscle Beach Party
Psych-Out
The Return of Dracula (BestBuy exclusive release)
The Thing with Two Heads
The Wild Angels

Twilight Time
Count Yorga, Vampire
Scream and Scream Again
Strange Invaders

Synapse Films
Countess Dracula

All released titles in alphabetical order 

The Abominable Dr. Phibes (OOP)
Alien from L.A.
An Evening of Edgar Allan Poe
Angel Unchained
The Angry Red Planet (OOP)
At the Earth's Core (OOP)
Attack of the Puppet People (OOP)
The Attic 
The Bat People
Beach Blanket Bingo (OOP)
Beach Party
The Beast with a Million Eyes
The Beast Within (OOP)
Bikini Beach
A Blueprint for Murder
The Boy and the Pirates
Captain Blood (1960)
Captain Pirate
Chosen Survivors
Chrome and Hot Leather
The Comedy of Terrors
Count Yorga, Vampire (OOP)
Countess Dracula (OOP)
Crawlspace
Cry of the Banshee
Crystalstone
Cycle Savages
Deranged (OOP)
Devils of Darkness
Die, Monster, Die! (OOP)
Donovan's Brain (OOP)
Dr. Goldfoot and the Bikini Machine (OOP)
Dr. Phibes Rises Again (OOP)
The Dunwich Horror (OOP)
The Earth Dies Screaming
Empire of the Ants (OOP)
The Fall of the House of Usher
Fireball 500
The Food of the Gods
Fortunes of Captain Blood
The Four Skulls of Jonathan Drake
Gas-s-s-s (OOP)
The Ghost in the Invisible Bikini
Ghost of Dragstrip Hollow
Gorilla at Large
The Haunted Palace
Hell's Belles
The House on Skull Mountain
How to Stuff a Wild Bikini
I Bury the Living (OOP)
The Incredible 2-Headed Transplant
Invaders from Mars (1986) (OOP)
Invasion of the Bee Girls
Invasion of the Star Creatures
Invisible Invaders
The Island of Dr. Moreau (1977) (OOP)
It! The Terror from Beyond Space (OOP)
Journey to the Seventh Planet
Killer Klowns from Outer Space
Konga (OOP)
The Land That Time Forgot
The Last Man on Earth
Madhouse (OOP)
The Man from Planet X (OOP)
Man in the Attic
Mars Needs Women (OOP)
The Masque of the Red Death
The Mephisto Waltz
The Mini-Skirt Mob
The Monster That Challenged the World
Morons from Outer Space (OOP)
Motel Hell (OOP)
Murders in the Rue Morgue (1971) (OOP)
Muscle Beach Party
Mystery on Monster Island
The Oblong Box
Panic in Year Zero!
The People That Time Forgot (OOP)
The Phantom from 10,000 Leagues
The Pit and the Pendulum (1961) (OOP)
Planet of the Vampires (OOP)
The Premature Burial
Psych-Out (OOP)
The Raven (1963) (OOP)
Reptilicus (OOP)
The Return of Count Yorga (OOP)
The Return of Dracula (OOP)
Scream and Scream Again
Ski Party
Strange Invaders (OOP)
Tales from the Crypt (OOP)
Tales of Terror
Tentacles
Theatre of Blood (also as Theater of Blood) (OOP)
The Thing with Two Heads (OOP)
Thunder Alley
The Tomb of Ligeia
Tower of London
The Trip (OOP)
Twice-Told Tales (OOP)
The Vampire (OOP)
The Vampire Lovers (OOP)
The Vault of Horror (OOP)
Village of the Giants (OOP)
Voodoo Island
War-Gods of the Deep (OOP)
What's the Matter with Helen? (OOP)
Whoever Slew Auntie Roo? (OOP)
The Wild Angels (OOP)
Wild in the Streets (OOP)
Witchcraft
Witchfinder General
X: The Man with the X-ray Eyes (OOP)
Yongary, Monster from the Deep (OOP)

OOP = out of print

See also
Scream Factory
IFC Films
Roger Corman's Cult Classics

References

External links
DiscLand's Midnite Movies Marathon
''DiscLand'''s Midnite Movies Marathon Vol. 2

Metro-Goldwyn-Mayer direct-to-video films
Metro-Goldwyn-Mayer
Home video lines